Goldhunga is a village and former Village Development Committee that is now part of  Tarakeshwar Municipality in Kathmandu District in Province No. 3 of central Nepal. According to National Population and Housing Census 2011, there are 3,806 households in the VDC and the total population is 16,174.

References

Populated places in Kathmandu District